The National Reconciliation Ordinance (NRO) was an ordinance issued by the former President of Pakistan, General Pervez Musharraf, on October 5, 2007. It granted amnesty to politicians, political workers and bureaucrats who were accused of corruption, embezzlement, money laundering, murder, and terrorism between 1986 - 2007, the time between three states of martial law in Pakistan.  It was declared unconstitutional by the Supreme Court of Pakistan on 16 December 2009, throwing the country into a political crisis. All names were supposedly kept in secrecy but the government was forced to declassify all the names after a successful intervention by the Supreme Court of Pakistan.

List of NRO beneficiaries
The Government of Pakistan issued a list of 8041 individuals who benefited from NRO including 34 politicians. The list includes Nusrat Bhutto and several other politicals figures.

References 

Corruption in Pakistan
Government of Pakistan secrecy
2007 in Pakistani politics
2007 in Pakistan